Naggsia laomontana is a species of air-breathing land snail, a terrestrial pulmonate gastropod mollusk in the family Plectopylidae.

Distribution
The distribution of Naggsia laomontana includes Laos.

References

External links

Plectopylidae
Gastropods described in 1862